Olivier Delamarche (born 9 February 1966) is a French economic analyst known for being the columnist for the television show C'est Cash on RT France.

Biography 
A former member of the French Society of Financial Analysts (SFAF), Delamarche was an analyst and then a sales trader for Pinatton, Wargny and Leven.

He created his own Sicav in 2004, then in 2005 a management company called Platinium Gestion which he sold in 2014.

From 2009 to 2017, he was a weekly columnist on BFM Business. However, he often took pessimistic views on the economy which the channel's writers were opposed to, so they decided not to keep him.

References

External Links 

 Olivier Delamarche (Lupus blog)

Living people
1966 births
French economics writers